Pavel Frinta (born 13 August 1969) is a Czech wrestler. He competed at the 1988 Summer Olympics, the 1992 Summer Olympics and the 1996 Summer Olympics.

References

1969 births
Living people
Czech male sport wrestlers
Olympic wrestlers of Czechoslovakia
Olympic wrestlers of the Czech Republic
Wrestlers at the 1988 Summer Olympics
Wrestlers at the 1992 Summer Olympics
Wrestlers at the 1996 Summer Olympics
Sportspeople from Prague